Atashgah (also Romanized as Ātashgāh and Ateshgāh) is a village in the Sabalan District of Sareyn County, Ardabil Province, Iran. At the 2006 census, its population was 1,049 in 253 families.

References 

Towns and villages in Sareyn County